C2orf80 (chromosome 2 open reading frame 80) is a protein that in humans is encoded by the c2orf80 gene. The gene c2orf80 also goes by the alias GONDA1 (gonad development associated 1). In humans, c2orf80 is exclusively expressed in the brain. While relatively little is known about the function of c2orf80, medical studies have shown a strong association between variations in c2orf80 and IDH-mutant gliomas, 46,XY gonadal dysgenesis, and a possible association with blood pressure.

Gene 
The c2orf80 gene is located on the negative sense strand of chromosome 2 at locus 2q33.3, and has nine exons. It spans from 208165347-2081902581. There are six isoforms of c2orf80.

Neighbors 
The loci near c2orf80 are protein encoding, and include genes IDH1 (histone deacetylase inhibitor 1), and CRYGB (crystallin gamma B).

The IDH1 protein is the NADP(+)-dependent isocitrate dehydrogenase found in the cytoplasm and peroxisomes. It is involved in catalyzing the oxidative decarboxylation of isocitrate to 2-oxoglutarate. Mutations in IDH have been associated strongly with gliomas, and it is a strong candidate for therapeutic targeting.

The gene CRYGB, or crystallin gamma B, encodes a protein found in the lens and cornea of the eye, and have been involved in cataract formation.

Gene expression 
Within the cell, it is possible that c2orf80 is expressed in the nucleus, or the mitochondria. An analysis via PSORT II concluded that there is a 47.8% probability that c2orf80 is located in the nucleus, and a 39.1% probability it is located in the mitochondria. The c2orf80 protein has two nuclear localization signals that may play a role in directing the protein to the nucleus of the cell.

C2orf80 is tissue specific, and expressed only in the brain. A tumor specific RNA assessment via The Cancer Genome Atlas showed significant expression of c2orf80 in gliomas. This reveals that c2orf80 is likely not functioning in neurons because gliomas are not present in neurons. Gene Paint explored expression of c2orf80 in infant mice, revealing concentrated expression in the frontal lobe.

Regulation of expression 
There are many transcription factors involved in the regulation of expression of c2orf80. Due to the tissue specific expression, only transcription factors with brain tissue specificity increase c2orf80 transcription. The promoter of c2orf80 X1 is GXP_9792289.

Protein 
The protein product of c2orf80 is 193 amino acids in length with a predicted molecular weight of 22kDa and an isoelectric point of 9.5.

Post-translational modifications 
Several different post-translation factors regulate the expression of the c2orf80 gene. There is a large disordered region spanning from amino acid 155-193 that is a possible site for phosphorylation from many kinases. The phosphorylations with the highest confidence scores are all modified by the same kinases, AGC, PKC, PKCh, and PRKCE which are involved in cell growth and death, and protein function modification. Other post-transcriptional modifications posited by EML are shown below.

Affinity chromatography verified interaction between Protein Kinase D2 (PRKD2) and c2orf80. The protein PRKD2 can bind to diacylglycerol (DAG) in the trans-Golgi network (TGN), and can be activated by phorbol esters as well as by gastrin via the cholecystokinin B receptor (CCKBR) in gastric cancer cells.

The protein ZNF804A (zinc finger protein 804A) has been shown by the first genome-wide significant association with the broad phenotype of psychosis to be associated with schizophrenia and bipolar disorder. When ZNF804A was knocked out, c2orf80 expression was downregulated, indicating a regulatory relationship between the two.

Structure 
The secondary structure is predicted to consist mostly of alpha helices. The predicted 3D structure via Alphafold is shown. Various alpha helices and a disordered region can be seen.

Function 
The function of the c2orf80 protein is unknown. There are indications that it could be involved in sex determination, or cell division regulation.

Homology 
C2orf80 is found in all vertebrates and was first seen 465 million years ago in sharks. There are no observed paralogs for c2orf80 within the human genome.

Orthologs 

The similarity to the human sequence generally decreases as the divergence date from humans increases, but there are some fluctuations in this trend possibly due to a functionally unimportant, poorly conserved region.

Clinical significance 
Published research studies that mention c2orf80 indicate it could be involved in a number of maladies. Variants in c2orf80 are associated with IDH-mutant gliomas, possibly due to the proximity of c2orf80 to IDH1 on chromosome 2.

Siblings with 46X,Y gonadal dysgenesis, a disorder of sex development, had a deletion of 8 of the 9 c2orf80 exons, and an interstitial duplication of the SUPT3H gene. Both mutations were inherited from the healthy mother. There is no known interaction between these two genes as of now.

References

External links 
 

Genes on human chromosome 2